The 1972–73 Divizia A was the fifty-fifth season of Divizia A, the top-level football league of Romania.

Teams

League table

Results

Top goalscorers

Champion squad

See also 
 1972–73 Divizia B
 1972–73 Divizia C
 1972–73 County Championship

References

Liga I seasons
Romania
1972–73 in Romanian football